Janet Polasky is Presidential Professor of History at the University of New Hampshire.

Polasky earned a B.A., at Carleton College in 1973, and a Ph.D from Stanford University in 1978.

Books

 Revolutions without Borders: The Call to Liberty in the Atlantic World (2015, Yale University Press)
  Reforming Urban Labor: Routes to the City, Roots in the Country
 Emile Vandervelde, Le Patron
 The Democratic Socialism of Emile Vandervelde: Between Reform and Revolution
 Revolution in Brussels, 1787-1793

References

21st-century American historians
Living people
University of New Hampshire faculty
Carleton College alumni
Stanford University alumni
Year of birth missing (living people)